The département of Bas-Rhin includes 1 urban community and 46 Communities of Communes gathering 517 communes over the 526 of the département. The commune of Siltzheim is part of the agglomeration community Sarreguemines Confluences which is in the département of Moselle.

Urban Communities 
 Urban Community of Strasbourg

Agglomeration communities 
(none)

Communities of Communes 
 Community of Communes Ackerland
 Community of Communes of the Alsace Bossue
 Community of Communes of the lower Zorn
 Community of Communes of Benfeld and surroundings
 Community of Communes of the Bernstein and the Ungersberg
 Community of Communes of Bischwiller and surroundings
 Community of Communes of the canton of Rosheim
 Community of Communes of the canton of Villé
 Community of Communes of the Carrefour des Trois Croix
 Community of Communes the Castles
 Community of Communes of the Coteaux of the Mossig
 Community of Communes of the Espace Rhénan
 Community of Communes of Gambsheim-Kilstett
 Community of Communes of the Grand Ried
 Community of Communes of the Hattgau and surroundings
 Community of Communes of the Upper-Bruche
 Community of Communes of the Kochersberg
 Community of Communes of the Lauter
 Community of Communes of Marckolsheim and surroundings
 Community of Communes of the Country of Erstein
 Community of Communes of the Country of Hanau
 Community of Communes of the Country of Marmoutier
 Community of Communes of the Country of Niederbronn-les-Bains
 Community of Communes of the Country of La Petite-Pierre
 Community of Communes of the Country of Sainte-Odile
 Community of Communes of the Country of Sarre-Union
 Community of Communes of the Country of Wissembourg
 Community of Communes of the Country of the Zorn
 Community of Communes of Pechelbronn
 Community of Communes of the Piedmont of Barr
 Community of Communes of the plain of the Sauer and the Seltzbach
 Community of Communes of the Vineyard's Gate
 Community of Communes of the region of Brumath
 Community of Communes of the region of Haguenau
 Community of Communes of the region of Saverne
 Community of Communes of the region of Molsheim-Mutzig
 Community of Communes of the Rhine
 Community of Communes Rhine-Moder
 Community of Communes of Sélestat
 Community of Communes of Seltz Delta of the Sauer
 Community of Communes of the Sommerau
 Community of Communes of the Soultzerland
 Community of Communes of the Uffried
 Community of Communes of the Moder Valley
 Community of Communes of the Sauer Valley
 Community of Communes of the Villages of the Kehlbach

Communes not linked to any community 
 Bitschhoffen
 Heiligenberg
 Jetterswiller
 Kleingoeft
 Niederhaslach
 Oberhaslach
 Still
 Urmatt

Geography of Bas-Rhin